Anogeissus dhofarica is a species of plant in the Combretaceae family. It is found in Oman and Yemen, where it is endemic to the South Arabian fog woodlands, shrublands, and dune ecoregion. It is threatened by habitat loss.

A. dhofarica is a tall tree which can grow up to 12 meters in height. It is dry-season deciduous, losing its leaves in November or December at the start of the winter dry season, and re-leafing when the southwest monsoon brings summer rains.

References

dhofarica
Vulnerable plants
Taxonomy articles created by Polbot
Trees of the Arabian Peninsula
Taxobox binomials not recognized by IUCN